Tudor Panțîru (born 26 October 1951) is a Moldovan and Romanian judge, politician and diplomat, former President of the Constitutional Court of Moldova, and former international judge of the Constitutional Court of Bosnia and Herzegovina (2002–2021).

Biography 
He was born in Baraboi, at the time in the Moldavian Soviet Socialist Republic, Soviet Union (now in Dondușeni District, Moldova). Panțîru graduated in Law at Moldova State University. In 1977-1980 he worked as a lawyer, in 1980–1987 as a judge and then as President of the Frunze District Court in Chișinău in 1987–1990. In the last two years he also chaired Moldova's commission for the appointment and promotion of judges. From 1990 to 1994 he served as Member of Parliament of the independent Republic of Moldova, chairing the parliament's legal committee in 1990–92. In 1992 he was appointed ambassador of Moldova to the United Nations. In 1996, he was chosen as judge from Moldova at the European Court of Human Rights (ECtHR) in Strasbourg.

In 2001 Panțîru moved to Romania; he currently lives in Bucharest.

In June 2002 he was appointed by the ECtHR President as international judge of the Constitutional Court of Bosnia and Herzegovina and he took up the office in September 2002. From May 2003 until June 2006 he served as the Vice-President Court. He will retire at age 70 in 2021. Since April 2002 he has also been serving as international judge at the Supreme Court of Kosovo, and since April 2005 he is the International Presiding Judge of the Special Chamber of the Supreme Court of Kosovo.

From December 2008 to 2012 he was elected to the Chamber of Deputies of Romania for the Social Democratic Party. He thus resigned from his position of international judge in Kosovo. He chaired the parliamentary committee monitoring the enforcement of ECtHR judgments. During the same period, he was also appointed a member of the Parliamentary Assembly of the Council of Europe, sitting in its Committee on Legal Affairs and Human Rights.

Since 2013 Panțîru is a judge of the Constitutional Court of Moldova, and on 12 May 2017 he has been elected as President of the Constitutional Court, for a three-year term.

He published numerous texts in journals "Legea și Viața" and "Avocatul Poporului" from Chișinău. He also wrote "The Protection of Refugees under the ECHR" in the book "Jurisprudence of the International Legal Institutions in Refugee Matters", edited by UNHCR BO in Moldova, Chișinău, 2000.

References

External links

1951 births
Living people
People from Dondușeni District
Moldovan MPs 1990–1994
21st-century Romanian politicians
Social Democratic Party (Romania) politicians
Members of the Chamber of Deputies (Romania)
Moldovan judges on the courts of Bosnia and Herzegovina
Moldovan judges on the courts of Kosovo
Judges of the Constitutional Court of Bosnia and Herzegovina
Permanent Representatives of Moldova to the United Nations
Moldovan judges
Constitutional Court of Moldova judges
Moldovan emigrants to Romania
Romanian people of Moldovan descent